John Thomas Hinton (1860 – 4 February 1931) was an Indian-born international rugby union forward who played club rugby for Cardiff Rugby Football Club and international rugby for Wales. He was an agent for the Royal Liver Assurance Company.

Rugby career 
Hinton was chosen for just a single international cap, which was awarded in the final game of the 1884 Home Nations Championship in a game against Ireland. Hinton was brought in as a replacement for George Lockwood Morris and was one of three new players brought into the pack; the others being Llanelli's Buckley Roderick and Samuel Goldsworthy of Swansea. Wales won the match by a drop-goal and two tries to nil; but despite the win Hinton was not reselected for the following tournament.

International matches played
Wales
  1884

Bibliography

References 

Welsh rugby union players
Wales international rugby union players
Rugby union forwards
1860 births
1931 deaths
Cardiff RFC players
Rugby players from Mumbai